Mario Russotto (23 July 1957, Vittoria) is a Roman Catholic bishop. He was ordained priest on 29 June 1981 by bishop Angelo Rizzo. He was appointed bishop of Caltanissetta on 2 August 2003 by Pope John Paul II and consecrated on 27 September 2003 by cardinal Salvatore De Giorgi.

References 

1957 births
Living people
People from Vittoria, Sicily
Bishops of Caltanissetta
Religious leaders from the Province of Ragusa